John Keeler (February 9, 1654 – May 19, 1717) was a member of the General Assembly of the Colony of Connecticut from Norwalk in the October 1698 session.

He was the son of Ralph Keeler and Sarah Howes and the brother of Samuel Keeler.

The Norwalk town meeting of February 20, 1679 named him among four "masters or overseers of those pounds  by five mile river side." His name appears in a 1694 list of "persons who are members of town meetings, who have a vote and suffrage in town affairs." The question of whether to repair and enlarge the meeting house or to build a new one "on the place where John Keeler's barn stands" was considered at a town meeting January 9, 1719.

References 

1654 births
1717 deaths
Deputies of the Connecticut General Assembly (1662–1698)
Politicians from Norwalk, Connecticut